is a Japanese politician of the New Komeito Party, a member of the House of Councillors in the Diet (national legislature). A native of Yamatokōriyama, Nara and graduate of Kyoto University, he was elected to the House of Councillors for the first time in 2001.

References

External links 
  in Japanese.

Members of the House of Councillors (Japan)
Kyoto University alumni
Living people
1947 births
New Komeito politicians